Nigel Press (born 8 March 1949) is a British geologist who pioneered the development of commercial applications of satellite earth observation technology in geo-science, and founded Europe's longest standing satellite mapping company. He is now Chairman of the charity MapAction.

Early life

Educated at The King's School, Canterbury and Imperial College London, Press graduated in Mining Geology in 1970 with underground experience in nickel, copper and lead-zinc mines. He worked briefly in geochemical exploration before commencing postgraduate work at Imperial on the potential applications of remote sensing for geological exploration, in anticipation of the launch of the first civilian earth observation satellites. Specifically, this focussed on the possible detection of the toxic effects of soil-bound heavy metals on vegetation as a mineral exploration tool.

Career

In 1972, Press founded Nigel Press Associates Ltd (NPA) to continue his research in the commercial arena with an emphasis on structural mapping and photogeology.  During the 1970s, in conjunction with Dutch geologist Dr. Wim Kampschuur, the Tectosat Exploration System was developed, using brittle fracture patterns found on satellite imagery as a means of better understanding mechanisms and consequences of plate tectonics. Studies were undertaken on a continent-wide scale throughout Europe (including the Greenland-Norwegian basin), Africa, Arabia and parts of India, linking extensive, specially collected field data to satellite interpretation. The studies were subscribed to by most of the world's major oil companies as well as mining companies and international organisations such as UNDP.  These studies formed the foundation on which further interpretation has been made worldwide by NPA Satellite Mapping (now CGG) up to the present day.

During this period, NPA became the leading commercial supplier of imagery from different satellite sources and the go-to supplier for photo-mosaicked images, and later, digitally processed images and mosaics - a forerunner service to today's Google Earth.
With the advent of the European Space Agency's radar satellites in the early 1990s, Press, in conjunction with Dr Geoff Lawrence, led NPA to develop Offshore Basin Screening using sea surface roughness patterns observed on radar imagery to detect slicks caused by traces of hydrocarbons seeping from the sea floor. This technique has become a universally recognised complimentary data source to seismic surveying and other offshore exploration tools, and is used by most of the world's major oil companies who draw on a global database compiled and maintained by CGG-NPA.

Growing availability of satellite radar during the 1990s led Press to focus NPA on developing methods using interferometric principles to detect small amounts of ground surface movement that remain difficult to survey with ground-based techniques. The ability to measure millimetric-level surface changes due to both geological and anthropogenic effects introduced a new dimension to environmental studies in disciplines ranging from earthquake and volcano studies to groundwater and oil extraction and engineering geology. It is now widely applied by CGG-NPA in monitoring projects such as fracking extraction, pipelines and transportation tunnelling. Much of this work was originally done as collaborative research projects with the British National Space Centre (BNSC, now UK Space), the European Space Agency, the Joint Research Centre and latterly under EU Framework Program for Research and Technological Development and Copernicus Programme. NPA, with project manager Ren Capes, conceived and led the ESA Terrafirma Project and the EU PanGeo Project.

Press was instrumental in founding British Association of Remote Sensing Companies (BARSC) and served several terms as chair. He was an advisor to the DG of BNSC and an Executive Member of The Parliamentary Space Committee. Press is a Fellow of The Geological Society of London and of The Royal Geographical Society.

In 2008, Press sold NPA to Fugro, who in turn sold NPA to CGG when they divested of their Geological exploration activities in 2012.  Press is no longer directly involved in the activities of CGG-NPA.

Press has been involved with MapAction since its inception in the late 1990s in the wake of the Bosnia crisis; one of MapAction's first volunteers was an NPA employee and NPA provided practical support and computer servers for many years. Press acted in the role of Development Director, became a Trustee in 2008 and subsequently Secretary to the Board. He took over as chair in December 2015.

Personal life

Press was a member of the University of London Boat Club from 1968 to 1973. With UL he was several times British University Champion in various classes and won two Henley medals. He has remained active at Masters Level winning at Henley Veterans and World Rowing Masters. In 2011, he was part of an expedition that rowed 1000 km down the Zambezi from Angola to the Victoria Falls: Row Zambezi Expedition. Press is an experienced mountain and fell walker and his geological work provided the opportunity to travel in many wilderness areas of the world.

Another passion is choral singing; as a student, Press was a peripatetic cathedral lay-clerk and has performed, broadcast and recorded with a number of London-based chamber choirs over the years. He currently sings with the Choir of the 21st Century, New Renaissance Voices and the Thomas Tallis Society.
Press is married to landscape artist Julia Corfe and they divide their time between rural Kent, the Yorkshire Dales and the French Pyrenees.  They have a daughter who is an art therapist. A younger daughter died in a mountaineering accident: Lydia Press Memorial Fund.

References

1949 births
Living people
British geologists
Alumni of Imperial College London